Gowran is a barony in the east of County Kilkenny, Ireland. There are 35 civil parishes in Gowran. The chief town today is Gowran. The barony contains the ecclesiastical sites of Kilfane and Duiske Abbey
The barony of Gowran is situated in the east of the county between the baronies of Fassadinin to the north (whose chief town is Castlecomer), the baronies of Kilkenny, Shillelogher and Knocktopher to the west (whose chief towns are Kilkenny,  Bennettsbridge and Knocktopher), and the barony of Ida is to the south. It borders County Carlow to the east. The M9 motorway bisects the barony.

Geography 

Gowran contains the towns of Thomastown, Paulstown, Bennettsbridge, Goresbridge, Gowran, Graiguenamanagh, and Inistioge, and the settlements of Ballyfoyle, Maddockstown, Whitehall, Castlewarren, Dungarvan, Rathgarvan or Clifden, Skeaghvasteen, and Johnswell.

There are 35 civil parishes in the barony (see map). They are: Blackrath, Blanchvilleskill, Clara, Columbkille, Dunbell, Dungarvan, Famma, Gowran, Graiguenamanagh, Grangesilvia, Inistioge, Jerpointabbey, Jerpointwest, Kilderry, Kilfane, Kilkieran, Killarney, Kilmacahill, Kilmadum, Mothell, Pleberstown, Powerstown, Rathcoole, Shankill, St. John's, St. Martin's, St. Maul's, Thomastown, Tiscoffin, Treadingstown, Tullaherin, Ullard, Wells, and Woolengrange. Three of which are split between the Barony of Gowran and the Baronies of Fassadinin and Ida (Mothell, Kilmadum and Inistioge). Most of the eastern boundary of the barony of Gowran is formed by the River Barrow.

History
The barony was part of the territory of the  historic kingdom of Osraige (Ossory). That kingdom was almost co-terminus with the still extant Catholic diocese of Ossory . In the Church of Ireland, the diocese has been merged into the diocese of Cashel and Ossory. Gowran is currently administered by Kilkenny County Council.
Gowran was recorded in the Down Survey (1656), and on Griffith's Valuation (1864). Parts of the barony were in the Poor law unions of Castlecomer, Kilkenny, and Thomastown. 

Territory of O'Carroll and O'Dunphy. Given to Theobald Fitzwalter (Butler ). Dobbyn family based there in the 15th century. Richard FitzPatrick was created Lord Gowran in 1715, and his son was created Earl of Upper Ossory in 1751. Both titles became extinct in 1818.

Contains the ecclesiastical sites of Kilfane and Duiske Abbey.

Kilbline Castle and Woodstock Castle are also located in Gowran.

See also

 List of baronies of Ireland
 List of townlands of County Kilkenny
 List of Irish Local Government Areas 1900 - 1921

Notes

References

External links

 
 
 

Gowran